Kartmazovo is the name of three rural localities in Russia:
Kartmazovo, Moscow, a village in Moskovsky Settlement of Moscow
Kartmazovo, Nizhny Novgorod Oblast, a selo in Bolshemurashkinsky District of Nizhny Novgorod Oblast
Kartmazovo, Vladimir Oblast, a selo in Sudogodsky District of Vladimir Oblast